Ilya Aleksandrovich Ratnichkin (born 6 June 1973) is a former Russian professional footballer.

Club career
He made his professional debut in the Soviet Second League in 1990 for FC Uralmash Sverdlovsk. He played 5 games in the UEFA Intertoto Cup 1996 for FC Uralmash Yekaterinburg.

References

1973 births
Sportspeople from Yekaterinburg
Living people
Soviet footballers
Russian footballers
Association football defenders
Russian Premier League players
FC Ural Yekaterinburg players
FC Lokomotiv Nizhny Novgorod players